Antti Juhani Rinne (born 3 November 1962) is a Finnish politician who served as Prime Minister of Finland from June to December 2019, and served as Leader of the Social Democratic Party between 2014 and 2020.

Biography
A lawyer by profession, Rinne holds a Candidate of Law degree from the University of Helsinki. He served as chair of the Union of Private Sector Professionals (ERTO) from 2002 to 2005, the Union of Salaried Employees from 2005 to 2010, and Trade Union Pro from 2010 to 2014.

Political activities
Rinne was elected chairman of the Social Democratic Party of Finland (SDP) on 9 May 2014, defeating Jutta Urpilainen.

He was Minister of Finance and Deputy Prime Minister of Finland between 2014 and 2015 and has been a Member of Parliament since 2015. In the 2019 parliamentary election, Rinne led the Social Democrats to victory and served as Speaker of Parliament before being appointed as Prime Minister on 6 June 2019.

Rinne cabinet

Rinne and his cabinet resigned on 3 December 2019, when the Centre Party withdrew its support due to controversies on the handling of a postal strike. President Sauli Niinistö asked him to continue with a caretaker government until a new government was appointed. On 10 December 2019, Sanna Marin was appointed as Prime Minister.

On 11 December 2019, Rinne was elected as the First Deputy Speaker of the Parliament, replacing Tuula Haatainen, who had been named as the Minister of Employment in the Marin Cabinet.

Controversies
In 2017, Antti Rinne provoked some controversy by encouraging Finns to reproduce.

Antti Rinne was convicted of organizing an illegal strike with Ammattiliitto Pro against the forestry industry. The conviction was upheld by the Court of Appeals (Hovioikeus in Finnish) with a decision in the end of 2018 which also ordered Rinne to pay fines and legal costs to the other party.

Rinne had to resign from an ACP lawyer position (Automotive, Cargo and Ports worker's union, AKT in Finnish). He was charging twice for the same work-related commute. According to him, it had been negligence and amounted to about FIM 1,000 (€200). In 2005, the President of the ACP stated in an interview with the Suomen Kuvalehti that it was FIM 10,000 (€2,000).

In a second case, Rinne was the manager of a housing company in Lohja in Finland. The Suomen Kuvalehti reported that he failed to return the receipts for the year and paid for his own telephone bill from the housing company's cashier. FIM 25,000 (€5,000) of damages were claimed from him by the housing company.

In 2022, Rinne applied for Mayor of Lohja. Rinne's socialist party has a long history of leading Lohja, but last year election results shifted the town council to right. The town council is expected to decide on the mayor in May 2022. The mayor's selection working group is led by Joona Räsänen, but he has recused himself, as Rinne is Räsänen's godfather.

References

|-

|-

|-

1962 births
Living people
Politicians from Helsinki
Leaders of the Social Democratic Party of Finland
Prime Ministers of Finland
Deputy Prime Ministers of Finland
Ministers of Finance of Finland
Speakers of the Parliament of Finland
Members of the Parliament of Finland (2015–19)
Members of the Parliament of Finland (2019–23)
20th-century Finnish lawyers
University of Helsinki alumni
Finnish trade union leaders